Allinagaram is a village in Theni district of the state of Tamil Nadu in India.

References 

Villages in Krishna district